Christopher Joseph Gallant III (born November 14, 1991), better known as Gallant, is an American singer and songwriter from Columbia, Maryland, signed to Mind of a Genius Records and Warner Bros. Records. He first began to gain recognition after self-releasing his debut EP, Zebra in 2014. His debut studio album, Ology, was released worldwide in April 2016 to critical acclaim, earning him a Grammy Award nomination for Best Urban Contemporary Album.

Early life and education 
Gallant was born in Washington, D.C. When he was in elementary school, he and his family moved to Columbia, Maryland, where he attended Atholton High School. He started recording songs during middle school. He was influenced by R&B artists and then later alternative rock while growing up.

In 2013, he graduated from New York University Gallatin School of Individualized Study where he studied music.

Musical Career

2013–2015: Early career and Zebra EP 
In the fall of 2013, Gallant moved to Los Angeles, California, to work on a career in music.

In 2014, he self-released his debut EP, Zebra, which he describes as "a sonic diary about dealing with the aftermath of New York".

In 2015, his single, "Weight in Gold", was played by Zane Lowe on Beats1's first air date in June 2015. The same year Gallant toured with Sufjan Stevens on his North American tour, where he performed 18 shows throughout the country.
Following the debut of "Weight in Gold" and a North American tour with Sufjan Stevens, Gallant was named one of 15 artists that Spotify believed were destined to "breakout" in 2016.
He is also featured in Zhu's (another Mind of a Genius Records artist) "Testarossa Music" from the Genesis Series EP. Gallant was also announced as the opener for Zhu's "Neon City" tour, spanning April and May in venues throughout America, beginning with Coachella.
On February 5, 2016, Gallant and Jhené Aiko released their first collaborative song, "Skipping Stones." The track was produced by Adrian Younge and co-produced by Stint (a frequent producer for Gallant), and features Gallant's signature falsetto style with specks of bold vocals and Jhené's signature soothing, a cappella-esque vocals. The song is licensed under Red Bull Media House and featured in its Red Bull Sound Select collection along with the B-side "Borderline".
Gallant performed both weekends of Coachella in 2016, which Billboard named the number one moment of the entire festival. Weekend one included a surprise appearance from Seal, where the pair performed Seal's song "Crazy" and Gallant's song "Weight in Gold". The following weekend, included a surprise appearance from Jhené Aiko where the pair performed their collaboration "Skipping Stones".

In the Room

On January 6, 2016, Gallant debuted the first episode of his new series In the Room with Sufjan Stevens. The pair performed Stevens' song "Blue Bucket of Gold". Gallant partnered with Spotify for the second episode, which featured Seal and premiered on March 9, 2016. Gallant and Seal performed Gallant's hit song "Weight in Gold". At the end of the episode, Seal claimed that he was Gallant's biggest fan. For the third episode, Gallant covered Janet Jackson's "I Get Lonely" with Jack Garratt. Gallant's next collaboration was with John Legend, on Legend's song "Overload" Gallant's next collaborations were with Andra Day and Dua Lipa for the fifth and sixth episodes respectively.

Gallant described the In the Room series as "an ongoing collaborative project – a chance to both pay tribute to and create something special with the artists that have inspired me the most".

2016–present: Ology, Sweet Insomnia, Neptune

Ology
Gallant's debut studio album, Ology, was released on April 6, 2016 by Mind of a Genius Records. The album received critical acclaim, including a rating of 7.5/10 from Pitchfork, a rating 4/5 from The Guardian, which states, “If this is what R&B’s future looks like it’s brighter than ever”. Also, Entertainment Weekly named Ology one of the 25 best albums of 2016 (so far). The album was given praise given for his distinct and diverse sound, voice, and lyricism.

On May 12, 2016, Gallant made his national television debut on The Tonight Show Starring Jimmy Fallon. Gallant performed "Weight in Gold", which ended with a standing ovation from the audience. Fallon ended the show praising Gallant's performance with the quote, “Oh my goodness! I told you… Watch out for this guy [GALLANT]!”.

In September 2016, Gallant performed "Bourbon" and "Weight in Gold" for the BBC on Later... with Jools Holland. On December 2, 2016, Gallant was a Special Artist at the 2016 Mnet Asian Music Awards, singing "Weight in Gold".

On January 26, he released "Cave Me In" in collaboration with Epik High's Tablo and Eric Nam. In the spring of 2017, he performed as the opening act on John Legend's Darkness and Light tour.

Sweet Insomnia

On January 25, 2019, Gallant released his sophomore album Sweet Insomnia. The album features Sabrina Claudio on "Compromise" and 6lack on "Sweet Insomnia", the album's title track.

Neptune

On March 26, 2021, Gallant released his second EP Neptune with features from Brandy, Arin Ray, and R&B duo VanJess.

Discography

Studio albums

Extended plays

Singles

As lead artist

As featured artist

Guest appearances

Songwriting credits

Note: Gallant previously had a concept for Finale, but got scrapped. It was retrieved and released with the deluxe album on December 6, 2019

Awards and nominations

|-
| 2017
| Ology
| Grammy Award for Best Urban Contemporary Album
| 
|-
| 2019
| Runaway Train (Jamie N Commons with Skylar Grey featuring Gallant
| MTV Video Music Award for Best Video with a Social Message
| 
|}

References

External links 
 Official website

1991 births
21st-century African-American male singers
American male singer-songwriters
American contemporary R&B singers
Living people
Atholton High School alumni
New York University Gallatin School of Individualized Study alumni
People from Columbia, Maryland
People from Washington, D.C.
Singer-songwriters from Maryland
21st-century American singers
21st-century American male singers
African-American songwriters
21st-century African-American people